DJ Hero is a rhythm video game and a spin-off of the Guitar Hero series. The game was developed by FreeStyleGames and published by Activision worldwide in October 2009 for the PlayStation 2 and 3, Wii, and Xbox 360 consoles. The game is based on turntablism, requiring the use of a special game controller that includes a turntable surface with three buttons, a crossfader bar, and an effects dial, in addition to other controller buttons used to manipulate in-game menus. In a manner similar to Guitar Hero, players use the turntable controller to mimic the actions of a disc jockey (DJ), such as scratching and crossfading between two different songs, as graphical representations of these actions scroll down on screen towards the player in time with the music. Unlike previous Guitar Hero games, there is no performance meter, and instead players are simply challenged to obtain the best score possible in order to earn stars (from zero to five for each mix) to unlock new songs, venues, and characters. The player can attempt these songs at one of four difficulties (Easy to Expert), with higher difficulties providing more actions for the player to perform within the song.

The game's on-disc soundtrack contains 94 mixes, most made from two songs; over 100 individual songs are incorporated into these mixes. Some mixes feature only a single song mixed with itself. Ten songs on disc include a guitar track that can be played using a Guitar Hero or other compatible controller alongside the DJ mixing player in the game's DJ vs Guitar mode. The game supports additional content through downloadable tracks from the game consoles' respective online stores. While most on-disc mixes were created by FreeStyleGames, several DJs have contributed mixes to the game, including Grandmaster Flash, DJ Shadow, DJ AM, DJ Z-Trip, DJ Jazzy Jeff, and the Scratch Perverts; other DJ artists provided future downloadable content.

On-disc soundtrack 
The on-disc soundtrack contains 93 mixes, each featuring one or two songs. These are arranged across 24 setlists, ordered roughly by difficulty of the mix, with more difficult mixes appearing later in the game. To access later tiers, the player must earn a pre-set number of stars on previous mixes at any difficulty. All mixes are immediately available to play in the Quickplay and competitive modes. The table below lists the mixes in the game, including the two songs that contribute to their mix as well as their individual artists; the mix artist that created the mix; whether the song is playable in the game's DJ vs Guitar mode; and the career tier in which the song is located.

Reviewers found the on-disc soundtrack to be strong; Daemon Hatfield of IGN believed that "the entire soundtrack is superb and could easily stand on its own outside the game". Matt Helgeson of Game Informer considered it to be one of the "most adventurous" soundtracks of any music game, and said though it often relied too much on pop hits, it remained true to the spirit of the DJ mix scene. Johnny Minkley thought the game to have "vital, varied, surprising and vast musical content" and to be a fresh experience compared to previous music games. The game did not sell well in the first month after its release; Ben Kuchera of Ars Technica attributed the low sales of the game partially to its soundtrack. While Kuchera felt the soundtrack was good, he asserted that individual songs were unrecognizable because of modifications made to them for the mixes, and that they were more difficult to adjust to within the gameplay itself.

Downloadable content 
New mixes were added regularly to DJ Hero through downloadable content that could be purchased on the console's respective online stores; content was made available on the day of the game's release. Unlike Guitar Hero games' downloadable content, which costs approximately US$2 per track, each mix costs approximately $3 to download because of the additional effort needed to create the mixes. Furthermore, mixes are provided only as bundles for PlayStation 3 and Xbox 360 users; the Wii's storefront prevents the selling of bundled packages; instead, each track is offered individually. Critics viewed the lack of individual song selection on the PlayStation 3 and Xbox 360 platforms as a way of limiting consumers' choice, as previous downloadable songs for games such as Guitar Hero allow players on these systems to select individual tracks to purchase from a bundle. The long time between the second downloadable pack (in November 2009) and the third pack (in March 2010) was also believed to be the result of a last-ditch effort by Activision to support the game, and that the few packs released did not meet expectations for the game. All of the DJ Hero DLC packs (along with the DLC of Guitar Hero, Band Hero) were taken offline on March 31, 2014, and are no longer available for download. However, they can be reinstalled if the player has downloaded any DLC pack before the removal.

Unused Mixes 
While the base game contained 93 mixes in total, there were 4 mixes that never made it into the game. These mixes either were at one point planned to be in the game or were confirmed to be part of the song list, but ended up being scrapped during development. These mixes included various songs from Nirvana, Ludacris, Red Hot Chili Peppers and so on.

References

External links 

Official website

Guitar Hero lists of songs